"Happy Landing" is a 1962 R&B recording by Motown Records singing group The Miracles, issued on that label's Tamla Records subsidiary label (T54073). It was recorded in November 1962, and appeared on their album The Fabulous Miracles. The group also recorded a live version of this song on their first live album, 1963's The Miracles Recorded Live on Stage.

Originally an "A" Side
Written by Miracles members Smokey Robinson and Ronnie White, Happy Landing was originally conceived as the "A" side of Tamla 54073, and was the first single issued from the album The Fabulous Miracles. This song was popular in many regions of the country, but was not charting nationally, because American disc jockeys, preferred and played the "B" side, You've Really Got a Hold on Me, which went on to become one of The Miracles' most successful songs, their second million-seller (after Shop Around), and a 1998 Grammy Hall of Fame inductee.

The song, in addition to being on the aforementioned Miracles' albums, also appears on the group's 4-CD box-set 35th Anniversary Collection and on their 2-CD set, The Miracles – Depend On Me: The Early Albums. It has inspired a cover version by The Temptations.

Personnel

The Miracles 
Smokey Robinson - lead vocals, co-writer, producer
Bobby Rogers - background vocals
Pete Moore - (absent due to military service)
Claudette Robinson - background vocals
Ronnie White - background vocals, co-writer
Marv Tarplin - guitar

Additional instruments

The Funk Brothers

References

"Happy Landing"- by The Miracles - Song Review from the "Motown Junkies" website
The Miracles–Depend On Me: The Early Albums liner notes, p. 12.
Smokey Robinson & The Miracles: The 35th Anniversary Collection [liner notes]. Motown Records
The Complete Motown Singles Vol. 2: 1962 [liner notes]. New York: Hip-O Select/Motown/Universal Records

1962 songs
Songs written by Smokey Robinson
Songs written by Ronald White
Motown singles
The Miracles songs
Song recordings produced by Smokey Robinson